The Landers Creek Bridge, also known as the Goodrich Bridge and located at the southern edge of Goodrich in Linn County, Kansas, is a stone arch bridge which was built in 1917.  It was listed on the National Register of Historic Places in 1985.

The bridge design reflects transition of materials:  it uses stone voussoirs but also concrete piers and concrete spandrel walls. Small limestone wing walls were added later.

References

Bridges on the National Register of Historic Places in Kansas
Bridges completed in 1917
Stone arch bridges in the United States
Road bridges in Kansas
Buildings and structures in Linn County, Kansas